Eagle Butte may refer to:

Eagle Butte, South Dakota
Eagle Butte, Alberta
Eagle Butte (Nevada)
Eagle Butte (Ziebach County, South Dakota)
Eagle Butte crater
Eagle Butte High School
Eagle Butte Mine